Ivan Andreyevich Bobylev (born 7 March 1991) is a former Russian professional footballer.

Club career
He made his Russian Football National League debut for FC Torpedo Vladimir on 27 May 2012 in a game against FC Chernomorets Novorossiysk.  He played Central Midfield.

External links
 
 
 Career summary at sportbox.ru

1991 births
People from Suzdal
Living people
Russian footballers
Association football defenders
FC Torpedo Vladimir players
Sportspeople from Vladimir Oblast